

Group A

Head coach:

Head coach:

Head coach:

Head coach:  Anatoliy Kroshchenko

Group B

Head coach:

Head coach:

Head coach:  Jacques Crevoisier

Head coach:

References

UEFA European Under-19 Championship squads